Broadwater is a small town in the Richmond Valley local government area, in the Northern Rivers region of New South Wales, Australia. In 2016, the town had a population of 640 people. It is on the Pacific Highway.

The history of Broadwater has largely revolved around its sugar mill. In 1863 Henry Cook and Alexander MacDonald became the first people to select land in the area. To begin with, sugar was grown and crushed on the small private farms in the region.

The Colonial Sugar Refining Company (CSR) opened the town's sugar mill in 1880. In the early days sugar cane was grown as far up the Richmond River as the town of Bexhill and was carried to the mill on punts. In 1978 CSR sold the mill to the newly formed New South Wales Sugar Milling Cooperative, which established its head office at Broadwater.

Today Broadwater is the centre of the region's highly mechanised sugar industry, which is still a major employer. In recent years the area has also seen an influx of new settlers, attracted by its peaceful rural lifestyle.

The nearby Riley's Hill Dock began operation in the late 19th century and many punts, river boats and larger vessels were built in the dry dock there. One of its last major jobs was the restoration of the Sydney Harbour ferry South Steyne in the 1980s.

Population
In the 2016 Census, there were 640 people in Broadwater. 86.4% of people were born in Australia and 91.2% of people spoke only English at home.  The most common responses for religion were No Religion 29.4%, Catholic 23.8% and Anglican 19.2%.

Gallery

References

Towns in New South Wales
Northern Rivers
Richmond Valley Council